Robert George "Bob" Wilson (born November 2, 1934) is a former politician in Manitoba. He represented Wolseley in the Legislative Assembly of Manitoba from 1975 to 1981 as a Progressive Conservative and then independent member.

He was first elected to the assembly in a 1975 by-election held on June 25, 1975 after Izzy Asper resigned his seat. Wilson was reelected in the 1977 general election, defeating Murdoch Mackay by 75 votes. In September 1979, he was charged with conspiracy to import and traffic in marijuana as the result of drug seizures in May and July of that year. Wilson was expelled from the Progressive Conservative caucus on November 20, 1980 and subsequently sat as an independent member. He was convicted on November 7, 1980 and sentenced to 7 years in prison. His appeal to the Supreme Court of Canada was denied on June 15, 1981 and his seat in the assembly was declared vacant on June 17, 1981.

In March 2011, Ian Jackson MacDonald, who had escaped police custody in June 1980, was returned to Canada by U.S. authorities. At that time, Wilson expressed hope that information from MacDonald would exonerate him of the earlier charges.  In 2014 Macdonald died but his testimony had failed to clear Wilson's name.

References 

Living people
Progressive Conservative Party of Manitoba MLAs
1934 births
Winnipeg city councillors